The 2016 Ladies Tour of Norway was the third edition of the Ladies Tour of Norway, a women's cycling stage race in Norway. It was rated by the UCI as a category 2.1 race.

Teams 
Eighteen teams participated in the race. Each team had a maximum of six riders:

Route

Stages

Stage 1
12 August 2016 – Halden to Fredrikstad,

Stage 2
13 August 2016 – Mysen to Sarpsborg,

Stage 3
14 August 2016 – Stromstad to Halden,

Classification leadership

See also

 2016 in women's road cycling

References

External links

Women's road bicycle races
2016 in women's road cycling
2016 in Norwegian sport